The Further Adventures of Sherlock Holmes is a series of radio dramas based on Arthur Conan Doyle's detective Sherlock Holmes. Written by Bert Coules as a pastiche of Doyle's work, the series was broadcast on BBC Radio 4 in 2002, 2004, 2008–2009 and 2010. There are sixteen episodes, all of them produced and directed by Patrick Rayner of BBC Scotland.  Clive Merrison stars as Holmes, having portrayed the detective in a 1989–1998 BBC radio series of dramatisations of every Sherlock Holmes story by Doyle (the first actor to do so). Andrew Sachs appears as Dr. Watson, replacing Michael Williams after Williams died following the Radio 4 run of Sherlock Holmes adaptations. Each of the stories is based on a throwaway reference from an actual Doyle short story or novel. The first two series are repeated regularly on BBC Radio 4 Extra.

The 2010 episode "The Marlbourne Point Mystery: Part Two" brings to eighty the number of episodes in which Clive Merrison has played Sherlock Holmes on BBC Radio 4.

Main cast
Sherlock Holmes — Clive Merrison
Dr John Watson — Andrew Sachs

Overview

Series 1

Series 2

Series 3

Series 4

Episodes

Series One

The Madness of Colonel Warburton
First transmitted 30 January 2002, this story is based on a reference from Doyle's short story "The Adventure of the Engineer's Thumb": "There were only two [cases] which I was the means of introducing to his notice—that of Mr. Hatherley’s thumb, and that of Colonel Warburton’s
madness."

Watson's old commanding officer is alarming his family with his interest in spiritualism.

Additional cast
 Colonel Warburton — Timothy West
 Mrs Bessmer — Eleanor Bron
 Mr Bessmer — Struan Rodger
 Michael Warburton — Jamie Newall
 Sir Robert — David Bannerman
 Mrs Fryer — Clare Corbett

The Star of the Adelphi
First transmitted 6 February 2002, this story is based on a reference from Doyle's short story "The Adventure of the Second Stain": "You must have observed, Watson, how she manoeuvred to have the light at her back. She did not wish us to read her expression...You remember the woman at Margate whom I suspected for the same reason. No powder on her nose—that proved to be the correct solution."

When a leading actor is stabbed to death, Holmes and Watson step behind the scenes into a world of pretense and deception.

This story is based on the actual murder of actor-manager William Terriss by Richard Prince outside London's Adelphi Theatre on 16 December 1897.

Additional cast
 Prince — John Bett
 Graves — Philip Anthony
 Terriss — Andrew Wincott
 Mrs Terriss — Richenda Carey
 Mrs Charlton — Jasmine Hyde
 Mr Charlton — David Bannerman
 Jessie — Helen Ayres

The Peculiar Persecution of Mr John Vincent Harden
First transmitted 13 February 2002, this story is based on a reference from Doyle's short story "The Adventure of the Solitary Cyclist": "He was immersed at the moment in a very abstruse
and complicated problem concerning the peculiar persecution to which John Vincent Harden,
the well-known tobacco millionaire, had been subjected."

A mysterious metal object found in a dead man's stomach holds a vital clue to his death.

Additional cast
 Mrs Harden — Jane Asher
 Philips — David Thorpe
 Annie — Claire Corbett
 Smith	— Peter Darney

The Singular Inheritance of Miss Gloria Wilson
First transmitted 20 February 2002, this story is based on a reference from Doyle's short story "The Problem of Thor Bridge": "Among these unfinished tales is that of Mr. James Phillimore, who, stepping back into his own house to get his umbrella, was never more seen in this world."

After years of apparent inactivity, master cat-burglar "The Ghost" is back with a series of thefts.

Additional cast
 Gloria Wilson — Toyah Willcox
 James Phillimore — Roy Hudd
 Inspector Athelney Jones — Siôn Probert
 Ringmaster — Sean Baker II

The Saviour of Cripplegate Square
First transmitted 27 February 2002, this story is based on a reference from Doyle's novel The Sign of the Four: "I assure you that the most winning woman I ever knew was hanged for poisoning three little children for their insurance-money..."

Holmes recalls a case from his past when the guidance of an extraordinary man helped solve a particularly diabolic crime.

Additional cast
 Collington Smith — Tom Baker
 Mrs Emily Guttridge — Siobhan Redmond
 Tobias Guttridge — David Holt
 Jenny Snell — Jasmine Hyde
 Doctor — Andrew Wincott
 Landlady — Helen Ayres

Series Two

The Abergavenny Murder 
First transmitted on 18 May 2004, this story is based on a reference from Doyle's short story "The Adventure of the Priory School": "... the Abergavenny murder is coming up for trial."

Holmes and Watson can rarely have been faced with such an uncooperative and unusual client, and they have just forty minutes to find out what problem has brought him to 221B Baker Street before the heavy boots of the official police force start clumping up the stairs.

This episode is performed in real time.

Additional cast
The Client — Ioan Meredith

The Shameful Betrayal of Miss Emily Smith 
First transmitted on 25 May 2004, this story is based on a reference from Doyle's short story "The Adventure of the Norwood Builder": "You remember that terrible murderer, Bert Stevens, who wanted us to get him off in ’87? Was there ever a more mild-mannered, Sunday-school young man?"

The murder of a young schoolmistress brings Holmes and Watson down to Kent.
Emily Smith's body was found in the middle of a snow-covered field. But, strangely, her killer left no footprints.

Additional cast
Bert Stevens — Mark Gatiss
Inspector Dawkins — Christian Rodska
Dr Trantor — Philip Fox
Mrs Trantor — Rachel Atkins
Alfred Laurenson — Chris Moran
Emily Smith — Jaimi Barbakoff

The Tragedy of Hanbury Street 
First transmitted on 1 June 2004, this story is based on a reference from Doyle's short story "The Adventure of the Golden Pince-Nez": "I see my notes upon the repulsive story of the red leech and the terrible death of Crosby, the banker."

Charlotte Adams is young, idealistic and happily absorbed in her volunteer work among the poor and suffering of the East End. So why should she kill herself?

Additional cast
Mrs Adams — Lindsay Duncan
Miss Wallace — Colette O'Neil
Charlotte/Alice — Lydia Leonard
Matthew Crosby/Dr Kelly — John Rowe
Jonathan Crosby/Patient — Chris Moran
Treeves/Card Sharp — Philip Fox
Mrs Quilley — Frances Jeater

The Determined Client
First transmitted on 8 June 2004, this story is based on a reference from Doyle's short story "The Adventure of the Golden Pince-Nez": "Here also I find an account of the Addleton tragedy..."

One man lies dead, the other seriously wounded. But the resourceful Miss Addleton cannot believe the police's version of events, and engages Holmes to save her father's good name.

Additional cast
Caroline Addleton — Fritha Goodey
William Addleton — Ian Masters
Thomas Addleton — Philip Fox
Frederick Addleton — Rhys Meredith
Mrs Sinden — Joanna McCallum
Lawyer/Clarkson — John Rowe

The Striking Success of Miss Franny Blossom
First transmitted on 15 June 2004, this story is based on a reference from Doyle's novel The Hound of the Baskervilles: "Since the tragic upshot of our visit to Devonshire [Holmes] had been engaged in two affairs of the utmost importance, in the first of which he had exposed the atrocious conduct of Colonel Upwood in connection with the famous card scandal of the Nonpareil Club."

A body in Hyde Park and a potential scandal at an exclusive gambling club bring Holmes back into contact with a beguiling but most notorious former client.

Additional cast
Colonel Upwood — Geoffrey Whitehead
Mrs Ricoletti — Maggie Steed
Inspector Lestrade — Stephen Thorne
Harold Upwood — Scott Brooksbank
Catterall — Philip Fox
Nicholson — John Rowe
The maid — Alice Hart

Series Three

The Remarkable Performance of Mr Frederick Merridew
First transmitted on 26 December 2008, this story is based on a reference from Doyle's short story "The Empty House": "'My collection of M’s is a fine one,' said [Holmes]. '...and here is...Merridew of abominable memory.'"

A night at the music hall ends in death, a Wild West sharpshooter finds a new personality, a brick wall crumbles and Holmes is engaged by a most unexpected client.

Additional cast
Merridew — Hugh Bonneville
Stamford — Malcolm Tierney
Charlotte — Jill Cardo
Fragson — Jonathan Tafler
Flora — Donnla Hughes
George — Stephen Critchlow

The Eyes of Horus
First transmitted on 2 January 2009, this story is based on a reference from Doyle's novel The Hound of the Baskervilles: "'Ah, Wilson, I see you have not forgotten the little case in which I had the good fortune to help you?'”

How could a priceless Egyptian antique vanish from a locked casket in a locked safety-deposit box in a locked vault in a locked bank? And why has the assistant manager disappeared?

Additional cast
Lady Mallory — Colette O'Neil
Lestrade — Stephen Thorne
Lofting — Stephen Critchlow
Wilson — Jonathan Tafler
Mrs Hartnell — Janice Acquah
Sergeant — Malcolm Tierney
Constable — Paul Rider

The Thirteen Watches
First transmitted on 9 January 2009, this story is based on a reference from Doyle's short story "The Noble Bachelor" and also on his non-Holmes story "The Man with the Watches".

A series of inexplicable and bizarre incidents on a non-stop express train brings a railway baron to Baker Street and takes Holmes and Watson to Rugby.

Additional cast
Inspector Athelney Jones — Siôn Probert
Sir Gregory Backwater — Nigel Anthony
James Harkness — Stuart Milligan
Sam — Inam Mirza
Ted — Robert Lonsdale
Landlady — Donnla Hughes
Sergeant — Dan Starkey

The Ferrers Documents 
First transmitted on 16 January 2009, this story is based on a reference from Doyle's short story "The Priory School": "'I am retained in this case of the Ferrers Documents.'"

What could possibly link a slum landlord, a vanishing prostitute, and a break-in at 221B Baker Street? In a case with no leads, the most important clue is that there are no clues at all.

Additional cast
Lestrade — Stephen Thorne
Robert Ferrers — Jonathan Tafler
Constable Dawkins — Thomas Arnold
Alice — Donnla Hughes
George — Gunnar Cauthery
Mrs Radcliffe — Janice Acquah
Shinwell Johnson — Dan Starkey

Series Four

The Marlbourne Point Mystery: Part One
First transmitted on 5 April 2010, this story is based on a reference from Doyle's short story "The Adventure of the Veiled Lodger": "I deprecate, however, in the strongest way the attempts
which have been made lately to get at and to destroy these papers. The source of these outrages
is known, and if they are repeated I have Mr. Holmes’s authority for saying that the whole
story concerning the politician, the lighthouse, and the trained cormorant will be given to the public."

In which Holmes and Watson find themselves in unfamiliar but impressive surroundings and (in Holmes's case) in somewhat unusual but not at all unwelcome company. The detective gets a chance to use one of his less frequently aired foreign languages, the doctor gets the shock of his life, a policeman becomes a suspect, a brass band plays a part, and the safety of the Empire is secured by a remarkable bird...

Holmes refers to this case in the Series Two adventure "The Abergavenny Murder", calling it "The lighthouse, the politician and the trained cormorant ... tedious little case, that."

Additional cast
Mycroft Holmes — James Laurenson
Constable Powell — Piers Wehner
Sir Charles Steele — Nigel Hastings
Mrs Chang — Pik-Sen Lim
Harold Jefferstone — Joseph Cohen-Cole
Mr Jefferstone — Bruce Alexander
Mr Lade — Richard Dillane
Elizabeth — Tessa Nicholson

The Marlbourne Point Mystery: Part Two
First transmitted on 6 April 2010.

The enigmatic Mycroft Holmes astonishes his brother as the shocking truth behind the mystery of the politician, the lighthouse and the trained cormorant is finally revealed.

Additional cast

as for Part One and,

Postmaster — Bert Coules

Recordings

Four of the episodes of each of the first two series were released on cassette and compact disc by the BBC Radio Collection in 2002 and 2004.  The recordings of the first series omit the episode "The Peculiar Persecution of Mr John Vincent Harden." The recordings of the second series omit the episode "The Striking Success of Miss Franny Blossom."  The compact disc release of the second series also features a bonus interview with Bert Coules at the conclusion of disc four.

The two unreleased episodes from the first two series were released in January 2009 in a third box set along with "The Thirteen Watches" and "The Ferrers Documents" from series three. The fourth set, released in April 2010 contains the two remaining stories from series three, "The Remarkable Performance of Mr Frederick Merridew" and "The Eyes of Horus" along with the new two-part story "The Marlbourne Point Mystery".

References

External links
Further Adventures details The BBC audio complete Sherlock Holmes
A review of The Further Adventures The Singular Society of the Baker Street Dozen

Further Adventures
Further Adventures
Further Adventures of Sherlock Holmes
Further Adventures of Sherlock Holmes
Further Adventures of Sherlock Holmes
2002 establishments in the United Kingdom
British radio dramas
BBC Radio dramas